Gornji Štoj is a village in the municipality of Ulcinj, Montenegro. It is located close to the Albanian border.

Demographics
According to the 2011 census, its population was 107.

References

Populated places in Ulcinj Municipality
Albanian communities in Montenegro